State Road 179 (NM 179) is a  state highway in the US state of New Mexico. NM 179's southern terminus is at NM 51 in Truth or Consequences, and the northern terminus is at NM 195 northeast of Truth or Consequences. It is 2-lane paved the entire length.

History

NM 179 was first established in the mid-1930s in Lincoln County. By the early 1940s this became an extension of NM 42. Then in the 1988 renumbering when NM 42 was broken up into smaller segments it became NM 247 and the NM 179 designation was moved to its current location. NM 179 now carries NM 195 through traffic since the road over the Elephant Butte Dam was closed in 2001. Prior to the closing of the dam, it carried westbound NM 195 through traffic when one-way traffic over the dam was permitted.

Major intersections

See also

References

179
Transportation in Sierra County, New Mexico